This is a list of tennis players who have represented the Argentina Fed Cup team in an official Fed Cup match. Argentina have taken part in the competition since 1964.

Players

References

External links
Asociación Argentina de Tenis

Fed Cup
Lists of Billie Jean King Cup tennis players